Jamil Mohamed Bubashit (born 1966) is a Saudi Arabian fencer. He competed in the individual and team épée events at the 1984 Summer Olympics.

References

External links
 

1966 births
Living people
Saudi Arabian male épée fencers
Olympic fencers of Saudi Arabia
Fencers at the 1984 Summer Olympics